Maharishi University of Information Technology (MUIT) is an Indian private university in Uttar Pradesh having its main campus at Lucknow and a satellite campus at Noida.
The university was established in 2001 by an Act No. 31 of 2001 vide Extraordinary Gazette notification of Government of Uttar Pradesh dated 6 October 2001. MUIT is approved by the University Grants Commission under section 2(f) of the UGC Act.
The university is among the oldest private universities of India being established 22 years ago in 2001.

History
Maharishi University of Information Technology is recognised by the state government of Uttar Pradesh, India.

Organisation and administration

Governance
The first Chancellor of MUIT was Maharishi Mahesh Yogi, Ajay Prakash Shrivastva is the current chancellor. Dr. Bhanu Pratap Singh is the current Vice-chancellor of MUIT.

Campus
 Maharishi University Of Information Technology - Lucknow, Uttar Pradesh
 Maharishi University Of Information Technology - Noida, Uttar Pradesh

Programs
Maharishi University of Information Technology provides undergraduate, graduate, and post graduate programs.

References

Private universities in Uttar Pradesh
Universities and colleges in Noida
Private universities in India
Universities and colleges affiliated with the Transcendental Meditation movement
Universities in Uttar Pradesh
Universities and colleges in Lucknow
Business schools in Uttar Pradesh
Educational institutions established in 2001
2001 establishments in Uttar Pradesh